Liv Uchermann Selmer (January 7, 1893 – January 24, 1983) was a Norwegian actress.

Selmer was born in Kristiania (now Oslo), the daughter of Karl Kristian Uchermann (1855–1940) and Bolette Hermana Schnitler (1864–1939). She married the actor Alfred Gjems Selmer (1893–1919).

She debuted at the National Theatre in Oslo in 1913 as the wicked fairy Mørkøie in the Norwegian translation of Zachris Topelius's play Sleeping Beauty. For the first 15 years of her career, she was engaged with various theaters in Oslo, Bergen, Trondheim, and Stavanger, and she was emplyed by the Oslo New Theater from 1929 to 1963. Her roles included Esther in Henri Nathansen's play Indenfor Murene (Inside the Walls), the title role (and later Herlofs-Marte) in Hans Wiers-Jenssen's play Anne Pedersdotter, and Mrs. Higgins in George Bernard Shaw's play Pygmalion.

Selmer appeared in several Norwegian films and performed in many broadcasts of NRK's Radio Theater. She played Eline in Henrik Ibsen's  Lady Inger of Ostrat at the Central Theater in a production in which Agnes Mowinckel played the title role. The production premiered on November 17, 1921. Two years later, Selmer played the green-clad woman in Peer Gynt at the National Theatre in Oslo. In 1928 she played Hjørdis in The Vikings at Helgeland in 44 productions across Norway during the Bjørnevik Theater's Ibsen tour.

Filmography
1938: Ungen as Lagreta, Julius's mother
1940: Tante Pose as the provost's wife
1940: Tørres Snørtevold as Mrs. Thorsen
1942: Den farlige leken as the cleaning woman
1942: Jeg drepte! as the head nurse
1943: Sangen til livet as Mrs. Kamp, Eli Braa's mother
1943: Vigdis as Minda Bjørkli
1944: Kommer du, Elsa? as Miss Enger
1948: Den hemmelighetsfulle leiligheten as the housekeeper
1951: Dei svarte hestane as Inger
1952: Trine! as Aunt Andrea
1959: 5 loddrett as a maid
1959: Støv på hjernen
1961: Sønner av Norge
1964: Klokker i måneskinn as a chambermaid
1965: Hjelp – vi får leilighet!

References

External links
 
 Liv Uchermann Selmer at Filmfront

1893 births
1983 deaths
20th-century Norwegian actresses
Actresses from Oslo
Norwegian stage actresses
Norwegian film actresses